The Concerto, BWV 525a (alternatively: BWV deest), is a trio sonata in C major for violin, cello and basso continuo, based on material otherwise found in Johann Sebastian Bach's first Organ Sonata, BWV 525 (outer movements), and Flute Sonata in A major, BWV 1032 (middle movement). The oldest extant manuscript containing the BWV 525a arrangement, D-B Mus.ms. Bach St 345, is dated to the middle of the 18th century. Breitkopf & Härtel published BWV 525a in 1965. Digital facsimiles of 18th- and 19th-century manuscript copies of the arrangement, in which the sonata is titled "Concerto", became available in the 21st century.

References

Sources

External links
 

Bach: spurious and doubtful works
Arrangements of compositions by Johann Sebastian Bach
Trio sonatas
Compositions for string trio
Compositions in C major